Eleandro Pema (born 9 February 1985) is an Albanian retired football striker. He last played for KS Dinamo

Club career
He has previously played for Samsunspor in Turkey.

Career statistics

References

External links
 Profile - FSHF

1985 births
Living people
Footballers from Tirana
Albanian footballers
Association football midfielders
Albania youth international footballers
Albania under-21 international footballers
Samsunspor footballers
KF Tirana players
FK Dinamo Tirana players
Flamurtari Vlorë players
KF Elbasani players
KS Kastrioti players
AZAL PFK players
FC Kamza players
Kategoria Superiore players
Kategoria e Parë players
Albanian expatriate footballers
Expatriate footballers in Turkey
Albanian expatriate sportspeople in Turkey
Expatriate footballers in Azerbaijan
Albanian expatriate sportspeople in Azerbaijan